Saad Abdulrahman Ali (born 2 May 1985) is a former professional basketball player. He played for Al-Sadd of the Qatar Basketball League. He was also a member of the Qatar national basketball team.

Saad competed for the Qatar national basketball team at the 2005 2007 and FIBA Asia Championship 2009.  He also competed for Qatar at their only FIBA World Championship performance to date, in 2006, where he averaged 12.8 points and 2.4 assists per game.

In 2009, Abdulrahman had his best individual international tournament to date, averaging 17.8 points per game for the Qataris.  He finished in the top ten leaders in points, minutes and steals per game en route to being named to the All-Tournament third team.  However, despite his efforts, Qatar finished sixth in the tournament and failed to qualify for their second consecutive FIBA World Championship.

References

1985 births
Living people
Qatari men's basketball players
Asian Games medalists in basketball
Basketball players at the 2006 Asian Games
Basketball players at the 2010 Asian Games
Point guards
Asian Games silver medalists for Qatar
Medalists at the 2006 Asian Games
Place of birth missing (living people)
Al Sadd Doha basketball players
2006 FIBA World Championship players